Diezephe is a village located in the Chümoukedima District of the Indian state of Nagaland and is a suburb of Chümoukedima, the district headquarters. It is the site of the Diezephe Craft Museum displaying woodcarving and weaving.

References

Villages in Chümoukedima district